Gilroy Santa Maria College is a Catholic systemic co-educational secondary day school, located in Ingham, Queensland, Australia.

History
The college is the result of a merger of two secondary Catholic schools, Cardinal Gilroy College for boys (named after Norman Gilroy, Archbishop of Sydney and operated by the Christian Brothers) and Santa Maria College for girls (operated by the Sisters of Mercy). Both colleges commenced in 1949. Changes in secondary education and the "abolition of the Scholarship year" led to the amalgamation of the two schools in 1973 on the Cardinal Gilroy College site in Chamberlain St.

See also 
 List of schools in North Queensland

References

External links 

Educational institutions established in 1949
Educational institutions established in 1973
Private schools in Queensland
Roman Catholic Diocese of Townsville
1949 establishments in Australia
Former Congregation of Christian Brothers schools in Australia